Antônio Augusto de Lima (5 April 1859 – 22 April 1934) was a Brazilian journalist, poet, musician, magistrate, jurist, professor and politician. He was born in Congonhas de Sabará (now Nova Lima).

Augusto de Lima was governor of the state of Minas Gerais, and he idealized the transfer of the state's capital from Ouro Preto to Belo Horizonte (then "Curral Del Rey").  In 1903, he became a member of the Brazilian Academy of Letters and was elected its president in 1928.

In 1906, Augusto de Lima was elected deputado federal (house representative) and moved to Rio de Janeiro, the federal district. There, he married Vera Monteiro de Barros de Suckow, granddaughter of Hans Wilhelm von Suckow,  Major of the Prussian Army (who fought Napoleon's army in the Battle of Waterloo) and patron of Brazil’s horse racing —  the first breeder of race horses in Brazil.

As a politician, Augusto de Lima defended female suffrage and was also an ecologist. He was strongly devoted to Saint Francis of Assisi, and was responsible for the first Amazon forest protection law in Brazil, implemented after a fifteen-year battle in congress.

Bibliography

Contemporâneas, poetry (1887)
Símbolos poetry (1892)
Poesias, poetry (1909)
Noites de sábado, chronicles (1923)
São Francisco de Assis, poetry (1930)
Coletânea de poesias (1880–1934)
Poetry (1959)
Tiradentes, poetry
Antes da Sombra, poetry (not released).

External links
Augusto de Lima's page — Brazilian Academy of Letters Website (Portuguese) 

1859 births
1934 deaths
Brazilian male poets
Members of the Brazilian Academy of Letters
People from Minas Gerais
Governors of Minas Gerais
Members of the Chamber of Deputies (Brazil) from Minas Gerais
19th-century Brazilian male writers
19th-century Brazilian poets
20th-century Brazilian male writers
20th-century Brazilian poets